Metropolitan Chrysanth ( secular name Yakov Antonovich Chepil, ; 24 June 1937, Volhynia – 4 January 2011, Moscow) was the Russian Orthodox metropolitan bishop of Vyatka, Russia.

Notes

Bishops of the Russian Orthodox Church
1937 births
2011 deaths
People from Kirov, Kirov Oblast